Relax The Back is a chain of specialty retail stores with almost 90 locations in the United States and Canada, specializing in back support products.

History 
The first Relax The Back store opened in Austin, Texas in 1984.  In 1987, an entrepreneur named Virginia Rogers purchased the original store and packaged the business into a franchise format.  The first franchise was opened in San Antonio in 1989 by Coby Dietrick, a former professional basketball player with the San Antonio Spurs.  In 1996, having grown the chain to 59 stores, Rogers sold the company to a franchisee, Dairl Johnson, for $6 million. Johnson continued to develop the company's independent franchising model. Relax The Back corporate offices are currently located in Long Beach, California.

As early as 1998, US News noted that the four major back-related stores, Healthy Back Store, Better Back Store, Relax the Back, and JoAnne's Bed & Back Shops, had a combined business of $75 million.

References 

Furniture retailers of the United States
Ergonomics companies
Retail companies of the United States
Retail companies based in California
Companies based in Los Angeles County, California
Long Beach, California
American companies established in 1984
Retail companies established in 1984
1984 establishments in Texas